Yim Fung was the joint chairman and chief executive of Guotai Junan International Holdings Limited, a subsidiary of Guotai Junan Securities, one of the largest securities brokers in China.

Disappearance
On November 18, 2015, it was reported that Fung had disappeared. Guotai Junan International's shares had fallen as much as 17% when it first announced about Yim's disappearance and it had appointed a temporary replacement.

Return
Guotai Junan International issued a statement saying Yim had returned after assisting in certain investigations and "neither Yim nor the company were the subject of the investigation". Yim had resumed his duties thereafter. The mysterious nature of Yim's disappearance coincided with a period when the government was focusing on the financial sector in its anti-corruption crackdown.

See also

List of solved missing person cases

References

1963 births
2010s missing person cases
21st-century Chinese businesspeople
Chinese chief executives
Formerly missing people
Living people
Missing person cases in China